Ole Hjellemo (March 22, 1873 – September 18, 1938) was a Norwegian musician and composer.

Hjellemo was born in Dovre in Oppland county, Norway. He studied under Gudbrand Bøhn and Iver Holter. Hjellemo directed the Dombås Music Society from 1895 to 1906. From 1919 to 1932 he taught violin, harmony, and composition at the Oslo Conservatory of Music, and at the same time was a military musician with the rank of lieutenant in the military band. As a composer, he wrote five symphonies, several other symphonic works and rhapsodies, an award-winning quartet, a violin concerto, and many works for choir.

He lived in Oslo, traveling back to Dovre for his summer vacations, where he instructed the corps and built the foundation for what would later become the Dovre Fiddle Club. Works that he composed for the corps included Norsk Rapsodi (Norwegian Rhapsody), Slått (An Air) and Fra Vågå (From Vågå), some of which are still played. His composition Slått was played by the Norwegian Royal Guards band and drill company in 2002. He also released some roundels from the Gudbrand Valley that he recorded himself.

Hjellemo died in Oslo.

Compositions 
 Bellmanstudie (Bellman, a study), in F major for orchestra, 10 min (1902)
 Dikt om en slått og en folketone (Poem on an air and a folk melody), for orchestra, 11 min (1926)
 Dønningernes duv (The pitching of the waves), for orchestra
 Finnmarken (Finnmark), for male choir (TTBB), solo, and orchestra
 Fire springleiker og en vals fra Gudbrandsdalen (Four roundels and a waltz from the Gudbrand Valley), 5 min (1934)
 Fra Vågå: Sprindans (From Vågå: roundel)
 Gavotte – Scherzando – Finale Marciale, for orchestra
 Hamar i Hellom, overture for orchestra
 Høgsommer i høgfjell (Midsummer in the mountains) for orchestra, 6½ min
 Karneval-suite (Carnival suite), orchestral suite (1918)
 Konsert (Concerto), for violin and orchestra in C major, 20 min (1933)
 Marsi: Maestoso marciale (Marches: maestoso marciale), for orchestra
 Rondo Capriccioso: Til Olav Aukrusts dikt "Aksión på Tande" (Rondo Capriccioso on Olav Aukrust's poem "Auction at Tande"), for choir (SATB), solo, and orchestra
 Sagn (Legend), for small orchestra
 Sagn i D-moll (Legend in D minor), for orchestra, 10 min (1934)
 Slått (Folk tune)
 Slått: Symfonisk karakterstykke (Folk tune: symphonic character pieces)
 Spelemannsferd: Symfonisk utdrag av Gudbrandsdalens folkemusikk (A fiddler's journey, symphonic extract of folk music from the Gudbrand Valley)
 Springdans (Roundel), for small orchestra
 Springleik (Folk dance) for orchestra
 Symfoni i H-moll (Symphony in B minor) (1921/22)
 Symfoni i Es-dur (Symphony in E flat major)
 Symfoni no. 3 i A-dur (Symphony no. 3 in A major), 40 min (1932)
 Symfoni no. 4 i E-dur (Symphony no. 4 in E major), 31 min (1935)
 Symfoni no. 5 i D-dur (Symphony no. 5 in D major) (1938)
 To norske folkemelodier (Two Norwegian folk tunes), for small orchestra
 Tve syst – Folkevise (Folk tune), for two voices (MA), choir (SATB), and orchestra (1937)

References

Norwegian composers
Norwegian male composers
Musicians from Oppland
People from Dovre
1873 births
1938 deaths
Norwegian Army personnel
Norwegian military musicians
Academic staff of the Oslo Conservatory of Music